The 1930 Green Bay Packers season was their 12th season overall and their tenth in the National Football League. The team finished with a  10–3–1 record under coach Curly Lambeau earning them a first-place finish and the Packers' second consecutive National Football League Championship.

Schedule

Standings

References
Sportsencyclopedia.com

Green Bay Packers seasons
National Football League championship seasons
Green Bay Packers
Green Bay Packers